The Ophthalmological Hospital is an Ophthalmology hospital in northeastern Nouakchott, Mauritania. It is located to the northeast of the Presidential Palace.

References

Nouakchott
Hospitals in Mauritania